Fairfield High School is a public high school in Fairfield, Ohio, United States. It is the only high school in the Fairfield City School District, and serves grades 10–12. The Fairfield City School district serves students in the city of Fairfield and Fairfield Township.

Demographics
The demographic breakdown of the 2,030 students enrolled for the 2012–2013 school year was:
Male - 50.7%
Female - 49.3%
Native American/Alaskan - 0.1%
Asian/Pacific islanders - 2.5%
Black - 15.5%
Hispanic - 5.1%
White - 72.8%
Multiracial - 4.0%

In addition, 27.2% of the students were eligible for free or reduced lunch.

Athletics
Fairfield athletic teams are known as the Indians. The Indians compete in the Greater Miami Conference. The Indians primary rival is  Hamilton High School.

Boy's
 Baseball
 Basketball
 Bowling
 Cross Country
 Football
 Golf
 Soccer
 Swimming
 Tennis
 Track and Field
 Wrestling
 Lacrosse
 Volleyball

Girl's
 Basketball
 Bowling
 Cheerleading
 Cross Country
 Dance Team
 Golf
 Soccer
 Softball
 Swimming
 Tennis
 Track and Field
 Volleyball
 Lacrosse
 Wrestling

Ohio High School Athletic Association state championships

 Boys' football – 1986
 Boys' baseball – 1985, 1991
 Boys' golf – 1979

Performing arts
Fairfield has three competitive show choirs: the mixed-gender Choraliers, the women's-only Pure Elegance and the men's-only FortissiBROs. The three groups completed a podium sweep at Marion Harding in 2019. Since 1999, Fairfield has also hosted its own competition, the Crystal Classic.

Notable alumni
 Jackson Carman, football player
 Corey Foister, 2016 Democratic candidate for Ohio's 8th Congressional District
 Jeff Hartsock, former MLB player 
 Eric Lange, actor
 Josiah Scott, football player

References

External links
 District website

High schools in Butler County, Ohio
Public high schools in Ohio
Fairfield, Ohio